Gusarkino is a rural locality (a village) in Semenkinsky Selsoviet, Belebeyevsky District, Bashkortostan, Russia. The population was 44 as of 2010. There are 3 streets.

Geography 
Gusarkino is located 34 km northeast of Belebey (the district's administrative centre) by road. Starosemenkino is the nearest rural locality.

References 

Rural localities in Belebeyevsky District